"Runnin" is a song performed by The Pharcyde and produced by J Dilla. It was released as the first single from The Pharcyde's second album Labcabincalifornia in 1995. The song peaked at #55 on the Billboard Hot 100, and reached #35 on the U.S. R&B chart. Also featured in The Pharcyde's greatest hits compilation Cydeways: The Best of The Pharcyde, "Runnin is one of Pharcyde's most remembered songs, along with "Passin' Me By".

Samples
The song samples popular jazz artist Stan Getz's "Saudade Vem Correndo", from his 1963 album "Jazz Samba Encore". The sample loops a small section of the track's bridge, layering on additions from other sections of Getz' song (such as Getz' sax solo parts).

"Rock Box" by Run–D.M.C. is also sampled, the "Run" sample plays the part of the hook.

The track "Qtio" by Brothomstates samples a line from this song.

In 2003, singer Mýa sampled the song for her single "Fallen", which led to ex-members Fatlip and Slimkid3 appearing on a remix of the song.

In 2009, rapper Wiz Khalifa sampled the song for the song on his mixtape, Flight School, "Name on a Cloud".

In 2017, the band UNKLE featured a sample of the song in the track "Iter 3 - Keep on Runnin, from their album "The Road: Part 1".

In 2019, Juice Wrld featured a sample of the song on the track, "Make Believe", from his album Death Race for Love.

In 2019, Logic used this song in his "No Pressure" freestyle.

Appearances in other media
In episode 39 of the U.S. TV series Entourage, the song plays after the final scene and continues to play throughout the closing credits.
The song is featured in season 2, episode 7 of New York Undercover, "Student Affairs" (1995).
The song is featured in the 2002 film 8 Mile as well as the More Music From 8 Mile soundtrack.
Marc Mac (of 4hero) did an interpretation of the song on his album Visioneers Dirty Old Hip Hop.
The song is featured in the 2011 film The Sitter starring Jonah Hill.
The song plays in the opening and final scenes of the 2018 film Tag.
The song is featured in episode 2 of the 2018 miniseries The Bobby Brown Story.
The song also plays in the trailer in the Adam Sandler movie “Big Daddy” even thought is was not in the actual film.

Charts

References

External links

1995 songs
Song recordings produced by J Dilla
The Pharcyde songs
Songs written by J Dilla
Delicious Vinyl singles